Yenibosna is a borough within the district of Bahçelievler in west Istanbul, Turkey.

The borough is in the west of Bahçelievler, bordering with the neighbor district Küçükçekmece. The original settlement was initially named Saraybosna, the Turkish language name for the city Sarajevo, which had previously been under Turkish rule during the Ottoman Empire period. Saraybosna remained a small settlement despite being a short distance from Istanbul, the capital of Ottoman Empire, and the earliest population record was 350. The founding of Republic of Turkey saw rapid development of the area, which was absorbed into Istanbul and the current name of Yenibosna ("New Bosnia") was adopted. The remains of the old settlement can be seen in the courtyard behind Yenibosna Primary School.

Demography 
Yenibosna had a population of 32,964 as of 2014.

The majority of the residents of Yenibosna borough are Bosniaks.

Sports 
The Sports club affiliated with the borough is Yenibosna Spor Kulübü.

References

Neighbourhoods of Istanbul
Bahçelievler